Doug Smith (born 20 December 1957) is a former Australian rules footballer who played with North Melbourne in the Victorian Football League (VFL).

Smith played as a reserve in the 1978 VFL Grand Final loss to Hawthorn, in his first season and seventh league game. A key position player, he was used as a forward and kicked two goals from 11 kicks.

Originally from Tallangatta, Smith had his most productive period from 1980 to 1982 when he put together 42 games.

References

1957 births
Australian rules footballers from Victoria (Australia)
North Melbourne Football Club players
Living people
People educated at Melbourne Grammar School